The 1972 Coupe de France Final was a football match held at Parc des Princes, Paris on 4 June 1972, that saw Olympique de Marseille defeat SEC Bastia 2–1 thanks to goals by Didier Couécou and Josip Skoblar.

Match details

See also
Coupe de France 1971-72

External links
Coupe de France results at Rec.Sport.Soccer Statistics Foundation
Report on French federation site
Summary and photos

Coupe
1972
Coupe De France Final 1972
Coupe De France Final 1972
Coupe de France Final
Coupe de France Final